R. Eric Thomas is an author of Here For It, a playwright, and television writer. He is best known as the author of Here For It, a National Bestseller.

Career 
For four years, Thomas wrote "Eric Reads the News," a popular daily humor column covering pop culture and politics for Elle. He is the long-running host of The Moth in Philadelphia and Washington, D.C.

He has written for the television shows Dickinson (Apple TV+) and Better Things (FX).

In February 2020, Thomas published the essay collection, Here for It: Or, How to Save Your Soul in America. The book was a National Bestseller and a Today Show Read with Jenna Book Club Pick. Here For It was a finalist for the Lambda Literary Award, named one of the best ten best book of the year by Teen Vogue, and one of the best books of the year by O: The Oprah Magazine. Lin-Manuel Miranda described the book as, "Pop culture–obsessed, Sedaris-level laugh-out-loud funny...one of my favorite writers."

In October 2020, Thomas and Helena Andrews-Dyer published the book, Reclaiming Her Time: The Power of Maxine Waters, named a Best Political Book of the Year by The Atlantic

The Washington Post described the book as, "There’s plenty of funny on these pages. And not just a line here or there; we’re talking curse you for making my face wrinkle this way I am now reaching for the eye cream funny. The writers are unabashed fans, writing for those who share the love and making the case that political biographies shine bright when they have as much panache as their subject."

In May 2022, Thomas will publish the YA book, Kings of B'more. BuzzFeed described the book as "infused with all the joy of the best teen movie."

Thomas won a 2022 Lambda Literary Award in the "LGBTQ Drama" category for his play, Mrs. Harrison.

Personal 
Thomas is gay and married to David Johnston Norse, a Presbyterian minister. The two were married in 2016.

Thomas is outspoken about his depression and struggles with mental health. He told The Advocate that he spent the two years writing Here For It "deeply, deeply depressed".

References 

Living people
American television writers
American gay writers
Year of birth missing (living people)
American LGBT screenwriters